G-Funk Entertainment (formerly known as G-Funk Records  and later renamed G-Funk 2000: The New Millennium) is an American vanity label founded by West Coast hip hop artist Warren G. It was a subsidiary of Def Jam, where it was dropped off and signed to Restless Records in 1998 under a new name to finally arrive to Hawino Records as G-Funk Entertainment in 2005, where Warren G released his album In the Mid-Nite Hour.

Roster
 Warren G
 Reel Tight
 Jessica
 Twinz
 Da 5 Footaz
 The Dove Shack

Discography

Past releases

See also
 List of record labels

References

American record labels
Companies based in Los Angeles
Hip hop record labels
Gangsta rap record labels
Record labels established in 1995
Vanity record labels